Juncus stygius, called the bog rush and moor rush, is a species of flowering plant in the genus Juncus, with a high circumboreal distribution, never reaching further south than Switzerland, Korea and Upstate New York.

Subtaxa
The following subspecies are currently accepted:
Juncus stygius subsp. americanus (Buchenau) Hultén – Korea, Pacific coastal Russia, Alaska, Canada, United States
Juncus stygius subsp. stygius – Eurasia less Korea and Pacific coastal Russia

References

stygius
Taxa named by Carl Linnaeus
Plants described in 1759